Harold Clarke was a British Olympic diver.

Harold Clarke may also refer to:
Harold G. Clarke (1927–2013), American jurist and politician
Allan Clarke (singer) (Harold Allan Clarke, born 1942), English rock singer
Michael Clarke (priest) (Harold George Michael Clarke, 1935–1978), Anglican priest and educator

See also
Harold Clark (disambiguation)
Harry Clarke (disambiguation)